The 1968–69 DFB-Pokal was the 26th season of the annual German football cup competition. It began on 4 January 1969 and ended on 14 June 1969. 32 teams competed in the tournament of five rounds. In the final Bayern Munich defeated Schalke 04 2–1, thereby winning their third title within four years and the fourth overall, making them the team with the most cup wins. It was also Bayern's first double.

Matches

First round

Replay

Round of 16

Replays

Quarter-finals

Semi-finals

Replay

Final

References

External links
 Official site of the DFB 
 Kicker.de 
 1969 results at Fussballdaten.de 
 1969 results at Weltfussball.de 

1968-69
1968–69 in German football cups